Jeff Trachta (born October 6, 1960, in Staten Island, New York) is an American actor and singer, best known for portraying Thorne Forrester on the soap opera The Bold and the Beautiful from 1989 to 1996. He was the second of four actors to play this role; he was preceded by Clayton Norcross and succeeded by Winsor Harmon. In June 2008, Trachta was seen performing on the Holland American ship, M.S. Amsterdam heading to Alaska. He appeared in the twelfth season of America's Got Talent as "The Singing Trump", impersonating President Donald Trump. He advanced past auditions receiving three "yes" votes from the judges. However, he was eliminated in the quarterfinals.

References

External links

1960 births
20th-century American male actors
American male soap opera actors
Living people
Male actors from New York City
Parodies of Donald Trump
People from Staten Island
Singers from New York City
America's Got Talent contestants